The Spy's Wife is a 1972 British short crime film directed by Gerry O'Hara and starring Ann Lynn, Dorothy Tutin, Tom Bell, Vladek Sheybal and Julian Holloway.

Cast
Dorothy Tutin as Hilda Tyler
Ann Lynn as Grace
Tom Bell as Tom Tyler
Vladek Sheybal as Vladek
Freda Bamford as Hilda's Mother
Glenna Forster-Jones as Shirley
Janet Waldron as Elaine
Julian Holloway as Man
Bunny May as Driver
Shaun Curry as Chauffeur

References

External links

1972 films
1972 crime films
British short films
British crime films
1970s English-language films
1970s British films